WASP-18b is an extrasolar planet that is notable for having an orbital period of less than one day. It has a mass equal to 10 Jupiter masses, just below the boundary line between planets and brown dwarfs (about 13 Jupiter masses). Due to tidal deceleration, it is expected to spiral toward and eventually merge with its host star, WASP-18, in less than a million years. A team led by Coel Hellier, a professor of astrophysics at Keele University in England, discovered the exoplanet.

Scientists at Keele and at the University of Maryland are working to understand whether the discovery of this planet so shortly before its expected demise (with less than 0.1% of its lifetime remaining) was fortuitous, or whether tidal dissipation by WASP-18 is actually much less efficient than astrophysicists typically assume. Observations made over the next decade should yield a measurement of the rate at which WASP-18b's orbit is decaying.

The closest example of a similar situation in the Solar System is Mars' moon Phobos.

The study in 2012, utilizing a Rossiter–McLaughlin effect, has determined the planetary orbit is well aligned with the equatorial plane of the star, misalignment equal to 13°.

See also 
 SuperWASP

References

External links 

Exoplanets discovered by WASP
Exoplanets discovered in 2009
Giant planets
Hot Jupiters
Transiting exoplanets
Phoenix (constellation)